Padre Coraje (English: Brave Father John) is a Spanish language television drama from Argentina. Its theme song is performed by Paz Martinez.

Plot 
When Coraje, a young idealist, sets out on a journey to La Cruz, his life is forever changed. Coraje and his friends come across Father John, a priest who has been assaulted by thieves while on his way to take over the parish at a church in La Cruz. Unable to save Father John's life, Coraje decides to pose as the priest. Coraje soon meets Ana and Clara Guericco, whose highly respected father was recently assassinated. Coraje soon finds himself entangled in a web of passion and secret desires. He is caught in a love triangle with the Guericco sisters. Coraje loves the Clara, and the wheelchair-using Ana cannot hide her desire for the priest. Deceit and treachery also drive the plot as the mystery of Guericco's death waits to be solved.

Cast

Main Cast

Supporting Cast

External links

Golden Martín Fierro Award winners
2000s Argentine television series
2004 telenovelas
2004 Argentine television series debuts
2004 Argentine television series endings
Argentine telenovelas
Freemasonry in fiction
Television series set in the 1940s
Spanish-language telenovelas
Pol-ka telenovelas